The 1978 Texas Longhorns football team represented the University of Texas at Austin in the 1978 NCAA Division I-A football season.  The Longhorns finished the regular season with an 8-3 record and defeated Maryland in the Sun Bowl.

Schedule

Roster

Game summaries

North Texas State

1978 team players in the NFL
The following players were drafted into professional football following the season.

References

Texas
Texas Longhorns football seasons
Sun Bowl champion seasons
Texas Longhorns football